Marquis of Lister (location now spelled Lista but grant uses older form) was a title of the Norwegian nobility. Lista lies in Southern Norway.

The title was given to the Italian Hugo Octavius Accoramboni of Florence by Frederick IV of Norway on 22 April 1709.

The coat of arms of the Marquis of Lister is described in the Encyclopedia of Noble Families in Denmark, Norway, and the Duchies (Lexicon over adelige familier i Danmark, Norge og Hertugdømmerne). A book by Amund Helland cites the following description in Danish:

In English:

See also 
 Marquis of Mandal

Literature 
 Helland, Amund: Topografisk-statistisk beskrivelse over Lister og Mandals amt : Første del : Den almindelige del 1903, Kristiania P. 643f.
 Kurrild-Klitgaard, Peter (2009). "Danish-Norwegian nobiliary titles for Italian gentlemen." Rivista Araldica: Rivista del Collegio Araldico 2008, 55-62.

Lista
Norwegian noble titles
Farsund